"Imagine" is a song by British rock musician John Lennon from his 1971 album of the same name. The best-selling single of his solo career, the lyrics encourage listeners to imagine a world of peace, without materialism, without borders separating nations and without religion. Shortly before his death, Lennon said that much of the song's lyrics and content came from his wife, Yoko Ono, and in 2017 the process to give Yoko co-writing credit (while not yet confirmed), was already under way.

Lennon and Ono co-produced the song with Phil Spector. Recording began at Lennon's home studio at Tittenhurst Park, England, in May 1971, with final overdubs taking place at the Record Plant, in New York City, during July. In October, Lennon released "Imagine" as a single in the United States, where it peaked at number three on the Billboard Hot 100. The song was first issued as a single in Britain in 1975, to promote the compilation Shaved Fish, and reached number six on the UK Singles Chart that year. It later topped the chart following Lennon's murder in 1980.

BMI named "Imagine" one of the 100 most performed songs of the 20th century. In 1999, it was ranked number 30 on the RIAA's list of the 365 "Songs of the Century", earned a Grammy Hall of Fame Award, and was inducted into the Rock and Roll Hall of Fame's "500 Songs that Shaped Rock and Roll". A 2002 UK survey conducted by the Guinness World Records British Hit Singles Book named it the second-best single of all time, while Rolling Stone ranked it number three in the 2004 list of "The 500 Greatest Songs of All Time". Since 2005, event organisers have played the song just before the New Year's Times Square Ball drops in New York City.

"Imagine" has sold more than 1.7 million copies in the UK. More than 200 artists have performed or covered the song, including Madonna, Stevie Wonder, Joan Baez, Lady Gaga, Elton John and Diana Ross. After "Imagine" was featured at the 2012 Summer Olympics, the song re-entered the UK Top 40, reaching number 18, and was presented as a theme song in the opening ceremony of the 2022 Winter Olympics. The song remains controversial, as it has been since its release, over its request to imagine "no religion too".

Composition and writing
Several poems from Yoko Ono's 1964 book Grapefruit inspired Lennon to write the lyrics for "Imagine"—in particular, one which Capitol Records reproduced on the back cover of the original Imagine LP titled "Cloud Piece", reads: "Imagine the clouds dripping, dig a hole in your garden to put them in." Lennon later said the composition "should be credited as a Lennon/Ono song. A lot of it—the lyric and the concept—came from Yoko, but in those days I was a bit more selfish, a bit more macho, and I sort of omitted her contribution, but it was right out of Grapefruit." When asked about the song's meaning during a December 1980 interview with David Sheff for Playboy magazine, Lennon told Sheff that Dick Gregory had given Ono and him a Christian prayer book, which inspired him the concept behind "Imagine".

With the combined influence of "Cloud Piece" and the prayer book given to him by Gregory, Lennon wrote what author John Blaney described as "a humanistic paean for the people". Blaney wrote, "Lennon contends that global harmony is within our reach, but only if we reject the mechanisms of social control that restrict human potential." Rolling Stones David Fricke commented: "[Lennon] calls for a unity and equality built upon the complete elimination of modern social order: geopolitical borders, organised religion, [and] economic class."

Lennon stated: Imagine', which says: 'Imagine that there was no more religion, no more country, no more politics,' is virtually The Communist Manifesto, even though I'm not particularly a Communist and I do not belong to any movement." He told NME: "There is no real Communist state in the world; you must realise that. The Socialism I speak about ... [is] not the way some daft Russian might do it, or the Chinese might do it. That might suit them. Us, we should have a nice ... British socialism." Ono described the lyrical statement of "Imagine" as "just what John believed: that we are all one country, one world, one people." Rolling Stone described its lyrics as "22 lines of graceful, plain-spoken faith in the power of a world, united in purpose, to repair and change itself".

An original piano musical motif, later called "John's Piano Piece", close to the final one was created in January 1969 during the Let It Be sessions. Lennon finished composing "Imagine" one morning in early 1971, on a Steinway piano, in a bedroom at his Tittenhurst Park estate in Ascot, Berkshire, England. Ono watched as he composed the melody, chord structure and almost all the lyrics, nearly completing the song in one brief writing session. Described as a piano ballad performed in the soft rock genre, the song is in the key of C major. Its 4-bar piano introduction begins with a C chord then moves to Cmaj7 before changing to F; the 12-bar verses also follow this chord progression, with their last 4 bars moving from Am/E to Dm and Dm/C, finishing with G, G11 then G7, before resolving back to C. The 8-bar choruses progress from F to G to C, then Cmaj7 and E before ending on E7, a C chord substituted for E7 in the final bar. The 4-bar outro begins with F, then G, before resolving on C. With a duration of 3 minutes and 3 seconds and a time signature of 4/4, the song's tempo falls around 75 beats per minute.

Recording and commercial reception

Lennon and Ono co-produced the song and album with Phil Spector, who commented on the track: "We knew what we were going to do ... It was going to be John making a political statement, but a very commercial one as well ... I always thought that 'Imagine' was like the national anthem." Lennon described his working arrangement with Ono and Spector: "Phil doesn't arrange or anything like that—[Ono] and Phil will just sit in the other room and shout comments like, 'Why don't you try this sound' or 'You're not playing the piano too well' ... I'll get the initial idea and ... we'll just find a sound from [there]."

Recording took place on 27 May 1971 at Ascot Sound Studios, Lennon's newly built home studio at Tittenhurst Park, with string overdubs taking place on 4 July 1971 at the Record Plant, in New York City. The sessions began during the late morning, running to just before dinner in the early evening. Lennon taught the musicians the chord progression and a working arrangement for "Imagine", rehearsing the song until he deemed the musicians ready to record. In his attempt to recreate Lennon's desired sound, Spector had some early tapings feature Lennon and Nicky Hopkins playing in different octaves on one piano. He also initially attempted to record the piano part with Lennon playing the white baby grand in the couple's all-white room. However, after having deemed the room's acoustics unsuitable, Spector abandoned the idea in favour of the superior environment of Lennon's home studio. They completed the session in minutes, recording three takes and choosing the second one for release. The finished recording featured Lennon on piano and vocal, Klaus Voormann on bass guitar, Alan White on drums and the Flux Fiddlers on strings. The string arrangement was written by Torrie Zito.

Issued by Apple Records in the United States in October 1971, "Imagine" became the best-selling single of Lennon's solo career. It peaked at number three on the Billboard Hot 100 and reached number one in Canada on the RPM national singles chart, remaining there for two weeks. Upon its release the song's lyrics upset some religious groups, particularly the line: "Imagine there's no heaven". When asked about the song during one of his final interviews, Lennon said he considered it to be as strong a composition as any he had written with the Beatles. He described the song's meaning and explicated its commercial appeal: "Anti-religious, anti-nationalistic, anti-conventional, anti-capitalistic, but because it is sugarcoated it is accepted ... Now I understand what you have to do. Put your political message across with a little honey." In an open letter to Paul McCartney published in Melody Maker, Lennon said that "Imagine" was Working Class Hero' with sugar on it for conservatives like yourself". On 30 November 1971, the Imagine LP reached number one on the UK chart. It became the most commercially successful and critically acclaimed album of Lennon's solo career.

Film and re-releases
In 1972, Lennon and Ono released an 81-minute film to accompany the Imagine album which featured footage of the couple in their home, garden and the recording studio of their Berkshire property at Tittenhurst Park as well as in New York City. A full-length documentary rock video, the film's first scene features a shot of Lennon and Ono walking through a thick fog, arriving at their house as the song "Imagine" begins. Above the front door to their house is a sign that reads: "This Is Not Here", the title of Ono's then New York art show. The next scene shows Lennon sitting at a white grand piano in a dimly lit, all-white room. Ono gradually walks around opening shutters that allow in light, making the room brighter with the song's progression. At the song's conclusion, Ono sits beside Lennon at the piano; they gaze at one another, and then kiss briefly.

Several celebrities appeared in the film, including Andy Warhol, Fred Astaire, Jack Palance, Dick Cavett and George Harrison. Derided by critics as "the most expensive home movie of all time", it premiered to an American audience in 1972. In 1986, Zbigniew Rybczyński made a music video for the song, and in 1987, it won both the "Silver Lion" award for Best Clip at Cannes and the Festival Award at the Rio International Film Festival.

Released as a single in the United Kingdom in 1975 in conjunction with the album Shaved Fish, "Imagine" peaked at number six on the UK Singles Chart. The photograph on the sleeve was taken by May Pang in 1974. Following Lennon's murder in 1980, the single re-entered the UK chart, reaching number one, where it remained for four weeks in January 1981. "Imagine" was re-released as a single in the UK in 1988, peaking at number 45, and again in 1999, reaching number three. As of June 2013, it had sold over 1.64 million copies in the UK, making it Lennon's best-selling single there. In 1999, on National Poetry Day in the United Kingdom, the BBC announced that listeners had voted "Imagine" Britain's favourite song lyric. In 2003, it reached number 33 as the B-side to a re-release of "Happy Xmas (War Is Over)".

Recognition and criticism
Rolling Stone described "Imagine" as Lennon's "greatest musical gift to the world", praising "the serene melody; the pillowy chord progression; [and] that beckoning, four-note [piano] figure". Robert Christgau called it "both a hymn for the Movement and a love song for his wife, celebrating a Yokoism and a Marcusianism simultaneously". Included in several song polls, in 1999, BMI named it one of the top 100 most-performed songs of the 20th century. Also that year, it received the Grammy Hall of Fame Award and an induction into the Rock and Roll Hall of Fame's 500 Songs that Shaped Rock and Roll. "Imagine" ranked number 23 in the list of best-selling singles of all time in the UK, in 2000. In 2002, a UK survey conducted by the Guinness World Records British Hit Singles Book ranked it the second best single of all time behind Queen's "Bohemian Rhapsody". Gold Radio ranked the song number three on its "Gold's greatest 1000 hits" list.

Rolling Stone ranked "Imagine" number three on its list of "The 500 Greatest Songs of All Time", describing it as "an enduring hymn of solace and promise that has carried us through extreme grief, from the shock of Lennon's own death in 1980 to the unspeakable horror of September 11th. It is now impossible to imagine a world without 'Imagine', and we need it more than he ever dreamed." Despite that sentiment, Clear Channel Communications (now known today as iHeartMedia) included the song on its post-9/11 "do not play" list.

On 1 January 2005, the Canadian Broadcasting Corporation named "Imagine" the greatest song in the past 100 years as voted by listeners on the show 50 Tracks. The song ranked number 30 on the Recording Industry Association of America's list of the 365 Songs of the Century bearing the most historical significance. Virgin Radio conducted a UK favourite song survey in December 2005, and listeners voted "Imagine" number one. Australians selected it the greatest song of all time on the Nine Network's 20 to 1 countdown show on 12 September 2006. They voted it eleventh in the youth radio network Triple J's Hottest 100 Of All Time on 11 July 2009.

Former US President Jimmy Carter said, "in many countries around the world—my wife and I have visited about 125 countries—you hear John Lennon's song 'Imagine' used almost equally with national anthems." On 9 October 2010, which would have been Lennon's 70th birthday, the Liverpool Singing Choir performed "Imagine" along with other Lennon songs at the unveiling of the John Lennon Peace Monument in Chavasse Park, Liverpool. Beatles producer George Martin praised Lennon's solo work, singling out the composition: "My favourite song of all was 'Imagine. Music critic Paul Du Noyer described "Imagine" as Lennon's "most revered" post-Beatles song. Authors Ben Urish and Ken Bielen called it "the most subversive pop song recorded to achieve classic status". Fricke commented: Imagine' is a subtly contentious song, Lennon's greatest combined achievement as a balladeer and agitator."

Urish and Bielen criticised the song's instrumental music as overly sentimental and melodramatic, comparing it to the music of the pre-rock era and describing the vocal melody as understated. According to Blaney, Lennon's lyrics describe hypothetical possibilities that offer no practical solutions; lyrics that are at times nebulous and contradictory, asking the listener to abandon political systems while encouraging one similar to communism. Author Chris Ingham indicated the hypocrisy in Lennon, the millionaire rock star living in a mansion, encouraging listeners to imagine living their lives without possessions, a sentiment that Elvis Costello echoed in his 1991 single "The Other Side of Summer". Others argue that Lennon intended the song's lyrics to inspire listeners to imagine if the world could live without possessions, not as an explicit call to give them up. Blaney commented: "Lennon knew he had nothing concrete to offer, so instead he offers a dream, a concept to be built upon."

Blaney considered the song to be "riddled with contradictions. Its hymn-like setting sits uncomfortably alongside its author's plea for us to envision a world without religion." Urish and Bielen described Lennon's "dream world" without a heaven or hell as a call to "make the best world we can here and now, since this is all this is or will be". In their opinion, "because we are asked merely to imagine—to play a 'what if' game, Lennon can escape the harshest criticisms". Former Beatle Ringo Starr defended the song's lyrics during a 1981 interview with Barbara Walters, stating: "[Lennon] said 'imagine', that's all. Just imagine it."

The morning after the November 2015 Paris attacks, German pianist Davide Martello brought a grand piano to the street out in front of the Bataclan, where 89 concertgoers had been shot dead the night before, and performed an instrumental version to honour the victims of the attacks; video of his performance went viral. This led Katy Waldman of Slate to ponder why "Imagine" had become so frequently performed as a response to tragedy. In addition to its general popularity, she noted its musical simplicity, its key of C major, "the plainest and least complicated key, with no sharps or flats" aside from one passage with "a plaintive major seventh chord that allows a tiny bit of E minor into the tonic". That piano part, "gentle as a rocking chair", underpins lyrics that, Waldman says, "belongs to the tradition of hymns or spirituals that visualise a glorious afterlife without prophesising any immediate end to suffering on earth". This understanding is also compounded by the historical context of Lennon's own violent death, "remind[ing] us that the universe can run ramshod over idealistic people". Ultimately, the song "captures the fragility of our hope after a violent or destructive event ... [bu]t also reveals its tenacity".

In June 2017, the US National Music Publishers Association awarded "Imagine" a Centennial Song Award and recognised Lennon's desire to add Yoko Ono as a co-author of the song.

Performances and cover versions

Elton John performed the song regularly on his world tour in 1980, including at his free concert in Central Park, a few blocks away from Lennon's apartment in The Dakota. On 9 December 1980, the day after Lennon's murder, Queen performed "Imagine" as a tribute to him during their Wembley Arena show in London. In 1983, David Bowie performed it in Hong Kong during his Serious Moonlight Tour, on the third anniversary of Lennon's death. On 9 October 1990, more than one billion people listened to a broadcast of the song on what would have been Lennon's 50th birthday. Ratau Mike Makhalemele covered the song on an EP of Lennon covers in 1990. In 1991–92, Liza Minnelli performed the song in her show at Radio City Music Hall. Stevie Wonder gave his rendition of the song, with the Morehouse College Glee Club, during the closing ceremony of the 1996 Summer Olympics as a tribute to the victims of the Centennial Olympic Park bombing. In 2001, Neil Young performed it during the benefit concert America: A Tribute to Heroes. Madonna performed "Imagine" during the benefit Tsunami Aid: A Concert of Hope. Peter Gabriel performed the song during the 2006 Winter Olympics opening ceremony. Herman Cain, then the CEO of Godfather's Pizza, performed a parody of "Imagine", identified as "Imagine There's No Pizza", before the Omaha Press Club in 1991, which became a viral video when he ran for President of the United States 20 years later.

Since 2005, "Imagine" has been played before the New Year's Eve ball drop at New York City's Times Square. Beginning in 2010, the song has been performed live; first by Taio Cruz, then in 2011 by CeeLo Green and in 2012 by Train. However, Green received criticism for changing the lyric "and no religion too" to "and all religions true", resulting in an immediate backlash from fans who believed that he had disrespected Lennon's legacy by changing the lyrics of his most iconic song. Green defended the change by saying it meant to represent "a world [where you] could believe what [you] wanted". The event got media attention outside of the US, with Britain's The Guardian stating "Lennon's original lyrics don't praise pluralism or interchangeable religious truths—they damn them".

Numerous artists have recorded cover versions of "Imagine". Joan Baez included it on 1972's Come from the Shadows and Diana Ross recorded a version for her 1973 album, Touch Me in the Morning. In 1995, Blues Traveler recorded the song for the Working Class Hero: A Tribute to John Lennon album and Dave Matthews has performed the song live with them. American singer and guitarist Eva Cassidy recorded a version for her 2002 album of the same name; this version failed to reach the top 100 in the United Kingdom but peaked at number 35 on the UK Indie Chart. Dolly Parton recorded the song for her 2005 covers album Those Were the Days. David Archuleta reached number 36 in US and number 31 in Canada with his rendition. A cover version of the song, performed by Italian singer Marco Carta, entered the top 20 in Italy in 2009, peaking at number 13.

Seal, Pink, India.Arie, Jeff Beck, Konono Nº1, Oumou Sangaré and others recorded a version for Herbie Hancock's 2010 album The Imagine Project. In February 2011, the recording won a Grammy award for Best Pop Vocal Collaboration.

"Imagine" was performed as part of the closing ceremony of the 2012 Summer Olympics. Performed by the Liverpool Philharmonic Youth Choir and the Liverpool Signing Choir, the choirs sang the first verse and accompanied Lennon's original vocals during the rest of the song. A cover performed by Emeli Sandé was also used by the BBC for a closing montage that ended its coverage. "Imagine" subsequently re-entered the UK Top 40, reaching number 18.

In 2014, to celebrate 25 years of UNICEF's Convention on the Rights of the Child, the organisation launched an initiative using the song. Performers including Ono, Hugh Jackman and ABBA announced the initiative at an event at the UN General Assembly in New York, with the intention of spreading the message that every voice matters. To do this, various celebrities and singers recorded cover versions of the song, which can be played on a downloadable app for people around the world to virtually sing with the celebrities and then share the videos on social media with related hashtags.

In 2015, American singer and songwriter Lady Gaga performed the song at the 2015 European Games opening ceremony. The song was played for 70,000 people in Baku, Azerbaijan, that served as host of the event. In 2018, the song was performed at the 2018 Winter Olympics opening ceremony in Pyeongchang (South Korea). The same year Yoko Ono released a solo rendition of the song, the first since she received credit as co-writer.

In 2020, amid the first COVID-19 lockdowns, Gal Gadot and a number of other celebrities performed an online version of the song intended to raise morale in the face of the pandemic. The performance was poorly received by audiences, many of whom criticized it for being a tone-deaf message from a group of socialites and members of the international elite who were largely unaffected by the pandemic. In June 2020, actor Chris O'Dowd, who appeared in the online version of the song, said the criticisms of the project were "justified", referring to the video as "creative diarrhoea".

A pre-recorded version of the song performed by John Legend, Keith Urban, Alejandro Sanz and Angélique Kidjo, with musical arrangement by Hans Zimmer, was featured in the opening ceremony for the 2020 Summer Olympics in Tokyo in July 2021, and another pre-recorded cover version again as a theme song in the opening ceremony of the 2022 Winter Olympics in Beijing in February 2022.

During the 2022 Russian invasion of Ukraine, Lennon's son Julian Lennon for the first time covered his father's song, calling on world leaders and everyone who believes in the song's sentiment of hope and peace to stand up for refugees.

"Imagine" is performed every New Year's Eve in New York City, just before the countdown to midnight begins. This is a tradition dating back to 1986.

Personnel
John Lennon – vocals, piano
Klaus Voormann – bass
Alan White – drums
The Flux Fiddlers – strings

Charts and certifications

Weekly charts

Original release

1975 release

Posthumous releases

Year-end charts

Decade-end charts

All-time charts

Certification and sales

See also

List of anti-war songs
List of best-selling singles in the United Kingdom
List of best-selling singles of the 1980s in the United Kingdom
List of Billboard Hot 100 top 10 singles in 1971
List of number-one singles in Australia during the 1970s
List of number-one singles of 1971 (Canada)
List of number-one singles of 1975 (Ireland)
List of number-one singles of 1981 (Ireland)
List of number-one hits (Italy)
List of UK Singles Chart number ones of the 1980s

Notes

References

Bibliography

Further reading

Documentaries

External links

1970s ballads
1971 songs
1971 singles
1975 singles
1981 singles
John Lennon songs
Apple Records singles
Song recordings produced by John Lennon
Song recordings produced by Phil Spector
Song recordings produced by Yoko Ono
Songs written by John Lennon
Songs written by Yoko Ono
Pop ballads
Rock ballads
British soft rock songs
Anti-war songs
Songs critical of religion
Grammy Award for Best Pop Collaboration with Vocals
Grammy Hall of Fame Award recipients
Irish Singles Chart number-one singles
Number-one singles in Australia
Number-one singles in Italy
Number-one singles in South Africa
RPM Top Singles number-one singles
UK Singles Chart number-one singles
Music videos directed by Zbigniew Rybczyński

Blues Traveler songs
Joan Baez songs
Madonna songs
Religious controversies in music